Abdelhak El Ghaadaoui (born 12 April 1992), is a Belgian futsal player who plays for Futsal Topsport Antwerpen and the Belgian national futsal team.

References

External links
 
 UEFA profile

1992 births
Living people
Belgian men's futsal players
Place of birth missing (living people)